La zingara (The Gypsy Girl) is an opera semiseria in two acts by Gaetano Donizetti, set to a libretto by Andrea Leone Tottola after La petite bohémienne (The Little Gypsy) by Louis-Charles Caigniez, which was itself derived from a work of August von Kotzebue.

It was Donizetti's first opera written for Naples, and the first performance of this "rescue opera" took place at the Teatro Nuovo on 12 May 1822.

One critic reviewing the 2001 recording from the Festival della Valle d'Itria, made the following observations:
Despite its moronic libretto, the opera was an enormous success at its premiere in Naples in 1822, and even Bellini wrote nice things about the second-act septet in which Donizetti mixes buffo and serious characters, as well as Neapolitan dialect (there are no recitatives; numbers are separated by spoken dialogue) with "pure" Italian, and the absurd plot is (sort of) held together by the clever Argilla, who under the guise of telling fortunes gains entry to people's feelings as well as to every area of the castle. Is it a masterpiece? Even close? No, but there are niceties galore—rhythmic arias and ensembles, good (if typical) characterizations, and good tunes.

Its American premiere was produced by Amore Opera in New York City in 2017.

Roles

Synopsis
Time: The middle ages
Place: Spain

Don Ranuccio has imprisoned Don Sebastiano in his castle and he also wants to kill the Duke of Alziras, his political rival. Ranuccio's daughter Ines is in love with Fernando, but her father wants her to marry Antonio who is Don Sebastiano's nephew.

Argilla, the gypsy girl of the title, brings together the lovers Ferrando and Ines, saves the life of the Duke, whom she brings together again with his brother, and frees Don Sebastiano, who turns out to be her father. Comedy is provided by the servant Pappacione, fooled into searching for gold in an old cistern. All ends happily.

Recordings

References
Notes

Cited sources
Osborne, Charles, (1994), The Bel Canto Operas of Rossini, Donizetti, and Bellini, Portland, Oregon: Amadeus Press. 

Other sources
Allitt, John Stewart (1991), Donizetti: in the light of Romanticism and the teaching of Johann Simon Mayr, Shaftesbury: Element Books, Ltd (UK); Rockport, MA: Element, Inc.(USA)
Ashbrook, William (1982), Donizetti and His Operas, Cambridge University Press. 
Ashbrook, William (1998), "Donizetti, Gaetano" in Stanley Sadie (Ed.), The New Grove Dictionary of Opera, Vol. One. London: Macmillan Publishers, Inc.  
Ashbrook, William; Sarah Hibberd (2001), in Holden, Amanda (Ed.), The New Penguin Opera Guide, New York: Penguin Putnam. . pp. 224 – 247.
Loewenberg, Alfred (1970). Annals of Opera, 1597-1940, 2nd edition. Rowman and Littlefield
Sadie, Stanley, (Ed.); John Tyrell (Exec. Ed.) (2004), The New Grove Dictionary of Music and Musicians. 2nd edition. London: Macmillan.  (hardcover).   (eBook).
 Weinstock, Herbert (1963), Donizetti and the World of Opera in Italy, Paris, and Vienna in the First Half of the Nineteenth Century, New York: Pantheon Books.

External links
 Information and synopsis (Italian), libretto
 Libretto
 La zingara, operone.de
 La zingara, Naxos Records

1822 operas
Italian-language operas
Opera semiseria
Operas
Operas based on plays
Operas by Gaetano Donizetti
Operas set in Spain
Rescue operas
Fictional representations of Romani people
Libretti by Andrea Leone Tottola